Xu Rong may refer to:

 Xu Rong (general) (died 192), military general serving under the warlord Dong Zhuo 
 Xu Rong (badminton) (born 1958), retired female badminton player from China
 Xu (state) (徐), whose people were referred to as Xu Rong by the Zhou dynasty